Pathaan is a 2023 Indian Hindi-language action thriller film directed by Siddharth Anand and written by Shridhar Raghavan and Abbas Tyrewala, from a story by Anand. The fourth installment in the YRF Spy Universe, it stars Shah Rukh Khan, Deepika Padukone, John Abraham, Dimple Kapadia, and Ashutosh Rana. In the film, Pathaan (Khan), an exiled RAW agent, works with ISI agent Rubina Mohsin (Padukone) to take down Jim (Abraham), a former RAW agent planning to spread a deadly lab-generated virus across India.

Produced by Aditya Chopra of Yash Raj Films, principal photography for Pathaan began in November 2020 in Mumbai. The film was shot over various locations in India, Afghanistan, Spain, UAE, Turkey, Russia, Italy and France. Two songs were composed by the duo Vishal–Shekhar, while Sanchit Balhara and Ankit Balhara provided the score. Against the norm, pre-release publicity was limited with no media interaction or public events. 

Pathaan was theatrically released in India on 25 January 2023, coinciding with the Republic Day weekend and received positive reviews from critics who praised its action sequences, music and cast performances (especially Khan, Padukone and Abraham). The film has grossed  worldwide, becoming the highest-grossing Indian film of 2023, the second-highest-grossing Hindi film of all time, the fifth-highest-grossing Indian film of all time, the eighth highest grossing film of 2023 and set several other box-office records in India and for a Hindi-language film.

Plot 
 
In 2019, the Indian Government revokes Article 370, which grants special status for Jammu and Kashmir. The news impacts a cancer-ridden Pakistani army general, Qadir, who decides to exact vengeance against India. He signs a contract with Jim, who leads "Outfit X", a private terrorist organization. Meanwhile, Pathaan, a former RAW agent, and his senior officerbNandini Grewal open a unit dubbed the "Joint Operations and Covert Research" (JOCR) unit, to recruit former RAW agents who were forced to retire due to past trauma or injury, but want to serve the country. 

With RAW joint secretary, Colonel Sunil Luthra's acceptance, Pathaan and his team head to Dubai to stop Outfit X's plans of attacking the President of India at a scientific conference. However, they realize that their actual plan was to kidnap two scientists, Dr. Farooqui and Dr. Sahani instead and the information they received about the imminent attack on the President was a ruse to mislead them. Jim attacks the scientists' convoy and Pathaan tries to stop him. A fight ensues, where Jim manages to escape with Dr. Sahani. At the debrief back at the agency, Luthra reveals that Jim was a former RAW agent and Kabir Dhaliwal's partner, who was awarded with the Vir Puraskar for his bravery after the agency could not find his body when Somalian terrorists killed his wife and unborn child in a negotiation gone-wrong. He had apparently faked his death in order to seek vengeance against the agency and country for not saving his family.

Meanwhile, Pathaan learns about the codeword dubbed "Raktbeej" and also that the dead people in Dubai were ex-agents and their money was transferred from the account of Rubina "Rubai" Mohsin, a Pakistani doctor in Spain. He travels to Spain and is captured by Jim's men, where he also learns that Rubai is an ex-ISI agent. When Jim leaves his hideout, Rubai attacks Jim's men and escapes with Pathaan. Rubai reveals that Raktbeej is in Moscow, where they travel to steal it before Jim does. However, Rubai betrays Pathaan and has him captured by the police. It is revealed that Jim used Rubai to make Pathaan steal the Raktbeej for himself. Pathaan is captured and taken to prison by train, but is saved by Avinash "Tiger" Singh Rathore.

Three years later, Pathaan travels to Africa and captures Jim's henchman Raafe. He meets Nandini and reveals about Jim purchasing two saber missiles, while Nandini reveals Rubai's location in Paris. Pathaan meets Rubai, who reveals that the Raktbeej is a mutated smallpox virus, which was forcibly developed by a captive Dr. Sahani under Jim's orders. She also expresses guilt about betraying Pathaan without knowing that her country would plan such an heinous attack. They travel to Jim's lab in Siberia and manage to recover one orb containing the virus with great difficulty, while Jim escapes with the other orb. Luthra and Nandini reach Jim's lab to take the orb back to a research facility, in India in order to develop a vaccine. Luthra also has Rubai arrested for having questionable loyalties.

At the research facility in India, Dr. Farooqui demonstrates the orb to Nandini. Jim calls them and reveals that the orb has already spread the virus in the facility. The infected scientists, along with Nandini die in the facility by shooting themselves, to curb the spread of the virus. Later, the facility is destroyed in a controlled blast. Jim provides an ultimatum to evacuate Indian soldiers out of Kashmir within 24 hours. Pathaan interrogates Raafe about the location of the missile, and learns that the missile is situated in Afghanistan. After rescuing Rubai, they lure Jim's associates into a trap, and attack Jim's base. Qadir is killed by Rubai before activating the missile containing the virus. Pathaan chases after Jim with a jetpack and they both crash land into a cabin.

Meanwhile, Rubai deactivates the missile, but finds that Raktbeej is not in the missile, but instead in a passenger-bound airplane, which is about to land in Delhi. She informs Pathaan, who finds that Jim has the detonator. Luthra calls the air traffic control to prevent the plane from landing in Delhi. In the cabin, Pathaan and Jim fight brutally, resulting in the cabin begin sliding off a cliff. Despite getting stabbed by Jim, Pathaan steals the detonator, deactivates Raktbeej and throws Jim out of the cabin as the foundation is about to break. While Jim holds onto a plank, Pathaan takes away his Vir Puraskar, deeming him unworthy of it. He stomps and breaks the plank Jim was holding onto, resulting in him falling to his apparent death. Afterwards, Pathaan is reinstated into RAW and made as the head of JOCR, while Nandini is posthumously awarded with the Vir Puraskar for her bravery.

In a mid-credits scene, Pathaan and Tiger are seen pondering about retiring and suggesting young agents who can replace them, but eventually decide to keep fighting the threats themselves.

Cast

Production

Development 
Yash Raj Films, Shah Rukh Khan, Deepika Padukone and John Abraham officially announced Pathaan on 2 March 2022 on their social media accounts, revealing the release date with a first look teaser. It was previously teased by other cast members, including Salman Khan and Vishal Dadlani, on various occasions before. Dadlani announced the film on Twitter, stating, "No number from the past matters, no number in the future is too big. The whole world is waiting for Shah Rukh, more importantly, we're all working on a kickass film with great songs." This film is YRF's first Dolby Cinema.

Casting 
Shanoo Sharma was the casting director. Khan was cast in the film in September 2020. Padukone joined production that November, while Abraham rounded out the main cast in June, joining filming in Mumbai. Dimple Kapadia was cast in December 2020. Salman Khan was confirmed to make a cameo appearance in November 2020, reprising his role as Avinash Singh Rathore from the Tiger franchise.

Filming 
Principal photography of the film began on 17 November 2020 in Mumbai. In January 2021, filming moved to Dubai. Some of the major action sequences including a long chase sequence were shot in the same schedule. On 12 April 2021, the crew took a two-day break. However, following the reports of some crew members of the film tested positive for COVID-19 and subsequent lockdown in Maharashtra, further schedules of the film were postponed. The filming resumed on 25 June at Yash Raj Studios in Mumbai. Later in July, another schedule of the film began. Padukone began filming in this schedule. A song was scheduled to be shot from 7 October in Mallorca and Cádiz, but the schedule was postponed.

In February 2022, production moved to Spain to shoot action sequences including Khan, Padukone, and Abraham. Filming then took place in Mallorca and Cádiz. The Spain schedule was completed in March 2022, with the Mumbai schedule completed in Yash Raj Studios as the film wrapped. In October 2022, reshoots and additional scenes were completed. The film was shot in multiple locations across India, Afghanistan, Spain, UAE, Turkey, Russia, Italy and France. It is the first Indian film to be shot in Siberia's Lake Baikal.

Music 

The soundtrack album for Pathaan was composed by Vishal-Shekhar, lyrics by Kumaar for the two songs "Besharam Rang" and "Jhoome Jo Pathaan". The original score was written and composed by Sanchit and Ankit Balhara, two of their score pieces "Jim's Theme" and "Pathaan's Theme" were released with the soundtrack album by YRF Music on 22 December 2022. Apart from its original, the soundtrack album was released in Tamil and Telugu.

Both the tracks – "Besharam Rang" and "Jhoome Jo Pathaan" – were conceptualized in a 'old-school' method, the latter a modern qawwali. "Besharam Rang" was the only Bollywood track of 2022 to gather 100 million views on YouTube in the least number of days. Upon its release, "Jhoome Jo Pathaan" crossed 5.1 million views and 738K likes on YouTube within four hours of release. Also, the song received 1 million views in less than 30 minutes after it was released. The song also received more than 18 million views within 20 hours of its release.  

Close to the film's release date, two promotional singles – "Pathaan – Teaser" composed by Balhara and  an Arabic version of "Jhoome Jo Pathaan" were released.

Controversy 
Right-wing Hindutva groups alleged that the song "Besharam Rang" promotes obscenity and that it disrespects the saffron colour as Padukone features in a saffron bikini in the song. Madhya Pradesh home minister Narottam Mishra called the song objectionable and warned that his government may consider banning the film if costumes in the song are not corrected. Khan's effigies and posters were burnt in various cities of Madhya Pradesh as a symbol of protest against the film. TV actor Mukesh Khanna questioned the Censor Board for passing the song despite obscenity. The News Minute termed the entire controversy as "shameless misreading for jingoism" and stated that there were five different costumes worn by Padukone in the song and the boycotters are criticizing this particular scene which features merely for 20 seconds as it suits their agenda. A Muslim organization also objected to the song.

On 29 December 2022, the Central Board of Film Certification asked the filmmakers to make some changes in the film, including in its songs citing culture and faith. The film went through some minor changes though the saffron dress scene in the song "Besharam Rang" was reportedly retained. Pathaan was later granted a U/A certificate by the Board.

On 4 January 2023, members of Bajrang Dal tore down the posters of the film at an Ahmedabad mall. They also warned them to not release the film in theatres. Gujarat Multiplex Association wrote a letter to Chief Minister Bhupendra Patel and Home Minister Harsh Sanghavi on the threats received by the theater owners in Gujarat from various groups. Sanghavi assured protection to multiplexes on the release of the film and instructed police chiefs of cities and districts to provide protection to the theatres.

On 17 January 2023, during the BJP national executive meeting in New Delhi, Prime Minister Narendra Modi told his party workers and leaders to refrain from making unnecessary remarks on films. Despite this, Bajrang Dal activists tore down posters of the film and set them on fire at a cinema hall which was about to screen the movie in Guwahati. Assam's CM Himanta Biswa Sarma assured Shah Rukh Khan that his government would maintain the law and order in the state.

Marketing 
The release date of Pathaan was revealed on 2 March 2022 through an announcement teaser. A first look motion poster was revealed on 25 June. The teaser of the film was released on 2 November, coinciding with Shah Rukh Khan's 57th birthday. It received 22 million views and more than 1 million likes in less than 2 days on YouTube. The official trailer was released on 10 January 2023. The film's trailer was also showcased on Burj Khalifa on 14 January 2023. Against norm, pre-release publicity was limited with no media interactions or public events.

Release

Theatrical
Pathaan was theatrically released, in standard, IMAX and 4DX versions, in India on 25 January 2023, coinciding with Indian Republic Day weekend along with dubbed versions in Tamil and Telugu. Pathaan was the first Indian film to release in the novel ICE theatre format. The film was released in 8000 screens worldwide, which included 5000 screens in Hindi and 450 screens in Tamil and Telugu versions within India.

Home media
The digital rights of the film were acquired by Amazon Prime Video, where it is scheduled to be premiere on 22 March 2023.

Reception

Critical response 
Pathaan received positive reviews from critics, with praise for its action sequences, music and cast performances (especially Khan, Padukone and Abraham). On the review aggregator website Rotten Tomatoes, the film has an approval rating of 85%, with an average score of 6.9/10, based on reviews from 27 critics. The site's critical consensus reads, "A slightly slapdash but still intoxicating blend of occasionally disparate ingredients, Pathaan offers over-the-top action thrills with Bollywood bells and whistles".

India 
Taran Adarsh of Bollywood Hungama rated the film 4.5 out of 5 stars and termed the film a "complete entertainer replete with action, emotions, patriotism, humour, thrill, and of course, the star power of Shah Rukh Khan". Sukanya Verma of Rediff gave the film a rating of 4 out of 5 stars and wrote, "Shah Rukh Khan's weathered intensity, grizzly charisma and trademark wit lends Pathaan's all-out, devil-may-care antics a sense of purpose that evades mindless acts of mayhem". Devesh Sharma of Filmfare rated the film 4 out of 5 stars and called it a "visual spectacle" while also opining that the action choreography was "truly out of this world". Saibal Chatterjee of NDTV rated the film 3.5 out of 5 and said, "Pathaan swings and strikes with all the style and aplomb in the world. It will be a hard act to follow". Renuka Vyavahare of The Times of India rated the film 3.5 out of 5 stars and wrote, "Pathaan has all the ingredients of a masala potboiler — slowmo entries, iconic battle of good versus bad and most importantly a sexy-smouldering Shah Rukh Khan, who can fight the good fight on and off the screen". Tanisha Bagchi of The Quint gave the film a rating of 3.5 out of 5 and wrote, "If Hrithik Roshan and Tiger Shroff's showdown in War kept you on the edge of your seats, Shah Rukh and John's fistfights and blows are nothing short of whistle-worthy". Abhimanyu Mathur of DNA India rated the film 3.5 out of 5 stars and praised the performances and score but termed some of the action scenes as "over the top and unbelievable".

Ritika Handoo of Zee News rated the film 3.5 out of 5 stars and mentioned, "There is not even a single dull moment in this YRF actioner. The action sequences between SRK and John are over-the-top yet mind-numbing". Tushar Joshi of India Today rated the film 3.5 out of 5 and stated, "Shah Rukh is the heart of Pathaan". Pooja Biraia Jaiswal of The Week rated the film 3.5 out of 5 stars and wrote, "Pathaan is a dishoom-dishoom joy ride between Khan and his perfectly beefed up antagonist Abraham. The intention is not to let the narrative drive the story forward, but to let the larger-than-life magic of its lead superstars cast its spell". Shubhra Gupta of The Indian Express rated the film 3 out of 5 stars and opined that it has "finally cracked the requirements of an action movie — non-stop action, leavened by glamorous leads, topped by the guy who can save the world, a high-octane set piece and an emo line at a time". Anna M. M. Vetticad of Firstpost rated the film 2.5 out of 5 and wrote, "Pathaan is so much fun when it’s being fun especially with a smashing Salman Khan cameo – that it is tempting to overlook its play-it-safe politics".

Sajesh Mohan of Onmanorama stated that "Siddharth Anand's Pathaan lays out a perfect red-carpet entry for Shah Rukh Khan into the YRF Spy Universe with its right formula of high-octane death and logic-defying action sequences seasoned with desh bhakti (patriotism) and qurbani (sacrifice)." Monika Rawal Kukreja of Hindustan Times stated, "Pathaan is your true-blue commercial, masala entertainer that's not trying to send across any message or be a social commentary on the current state of affairs in the country. It's fun, non-fussy and fantastic at the same time". Nandini Ramnath of Scroll.in wrote, "The film's greatest blaster is its hero itself, parleying his well-oiled impishness, time-tested charm and mesmeric screen presence for a cheesy but also entertaining save-the-nation exercise".

International 
Cath Clarke of The Guardian rated the film 3 out of 5 stars and wrote, "This enjoyable high-octane action spy movie from India is possibly the most fun you can currently have at the cinema. Still, the cheers kept coming; the loudest whoop of all when Salman Khan made an entrance as Tiger, a hero from an earlier movie in the series". Conversely, Simon Abrams of TheWrap dismissed it as "an amateurish Indian super-spy thriller that’s never as well-executed as it is conceptually goofy and politically dubious". Owen Gleiberman of Variety was similarly not impressed, terming the film a "a sprawling, mountainous tangle of pulp that stacks one genre on top of the next with an arbitrary verve", but picked up the "iconic quality of its stars" Khan and Abraham for praise. Timon Singh of Empire summarised, "Pathaan delivers everything that an Indian blockbuster should: a guaranteed box office draw with Khan, exotic locales, crowd-pleasing cameos, stunning dance numbers and gravity-defying stunts that make the Fast and Furious franchise look restrained."

Box office
Pathaan broke several box-office opening records for a Hindi film. Globally, it became the first Hindi film to gross  on its first day. It earned  worldwide on its opening day, including  overseas. Worldwide, the film crossed the  mark, in the first two days, the  mark in the first three days, and the  mark in its first four days, becoming the fastest Hindi film to do all. It broke these records previously held by the Hindi version of the Kannada film K.G.F: Chapter 2 (2022). By the second weekend, it became the first original Hindi film to net over  domestically, overtaking Dangal (2016).

Outside India, Pathaan opening-weekend overseas gross totalled US$25.5 million in its five-day extended weekend. IMAX grosses accounted for US$2.5 million, the highest for an Indian film. In North America and Canada, it earned US$6.88 million in its opening weekend from 695 theatres, finishing third, for a total of US$9.48 million; a record for a Hindi film. In the United Kingdom and Ireland box office, it recorded the highest single-day gross for an Indian film with £319,348. Over the weekend, it earned £1.4 million, finishing second after Avatar: The Way of Water, for a total of £2 million. It set further Hindi-film opening weekend records in UAE, Malaysia, Singapore, and Saudi Arabia, and Indian-film opening weekend records in Australia, New Zealand, and Germany. With a US$582,000 gross in Germany, it became the highest-grossing Hindi film in the market in its opening weekend itself. Box Office India reported that by grossing around US$31 million in its first eight days, it became the highest-grossing Hindi film in overseas, excluding China (where it did not release). 

By the second weekend, Pathaan emerged as the highest-grossing Hindi film in the US, earning over $13.4 million, overtaking Dangal, and in the UK, it became the first Indian film to earn over £3 million, grossing $4.15 million. It also became the highest-grossing Indian film in UAE, Australia, and New Zealand. Pathaan emerged as the first Hindi film to gross over $100 million without a China release.

On its fourth Wednesday, Pathaan became the first Hindi film to earn 500 crore net in India. On the twenty seventh day of its release, Pathaan became the fifth Indian film to gross 1000 crore worldwide and only the second Hindi film to do so. On the 39th day of its release, it crossed Baahubali 2: The Conclusion to become the highest grossing film in Hindi language ever.

This made it the second-highest-grossing Hindi film, fifth-highest-grossing Indian film, the fourth-highest-grossing film in the domestic market and the highest-grossing of Khan's career.

References

External links 
  
 

2020s Hindi-language films
2020s spy thriller films
2023 action thriller films
2023 films
Films directed by Siddharth Anand
Films scored by Vishal–Shekhar
Films shot in Dubai
Films shot in Mallorca
Films shot in Mumbai
Films set in Afghanistan
Films shot in Afghanistan
Films shot in Spain
Films set in Russia
Films set in Siberia
Films about terrorism in India
Films based on Indo-Pakistani wars and conflicts
Indian action thriller films
Indian spy thriller films
Yash Raj Films films
IMAX films